Imbonggu District is a district of the Southern Highlands Province of Papua New Guinea.  Its capital currently is Walume, but previously it was Ialibu Station.  The population was 80,994 at the 2011 census.

References

Districts of Papua New Guinea
Southern Highlands Province